William Thompson (April 26th, 1726 - September 3, 1781) was a soldier from Pennsylvania who served as a colonel and later brigadier general in the Continental Army during the American Revolutionary War.

Thompson was born in Ireland and emigrated to Carlisle, Pennsylvania. During the French and Indian War, Thompson served as a captain in the Kittanning Expedition under John Armstrong.

After news of the Battle of Bunker Hill reached Pennsylvania in 1775, Thompson was appointed colonel of a rifle battalion and was sent to Massachusetts to help in the defense of Boston. His unit was known as Thompson's Pennsylvania Rifle Battalion, or the 1st Pennsylvania Regiment. After Thompson's company of Pennsylvania sharpshooters drove back a British
landing-party on November 9, 1775, he was made a brigadier-general, to the displeasure of George Washington, who had reservations about Thompson's abilities.

Sent to reinforce American troops in Canada, Thompson was captured during an attack on the enemy at Trois-Rivières in Quebec on June 8, 1776. He was paroled, but not exchanged for four years, and so he could not reenter military service. Thompson blamed Congressman Thomas McKean for hindering his exchange; his criticism became so harsh that he was censured by Congress. McKean successfully sued Thompson for libel.

Thompson married Catherine Ross, sister of George Ross, signer of the Declaration of Independence for Pennsylvania.

While on parole in Philadelphia on December 17, 1778 he became an early Member of the Friendly Sons of St. Patrick

After finally being exchanged for Baron Riedesel, Thompson died at his home near Carlisle.

Thompson Street in the Greenwich Village and SoHo neighborhoods of Manhattan in New York City was named after General Thompson, as well as – originally – the adjacent Vesuvio Playground.

References

Cumberland County PA Archives
Boatner, Mark Mayo, III. Encyclopedia of the American Revolution. New York: McKay, 1966; revised 1974. .

External links

Journals of the Continental Congress, 1774–1789. Monday, November 23, 1778. Censure of Thompson.
The Wild Geese Today: The Resurrection of Edward Hand. Irish-born soldier served  Mike Flannery, George Washington and his adopted nation well

Sam Maner Revolutionary War Generals site

1736 births
1781 deaths
American Revolutionary War prisoners of war held by Great Britain
Continental Army generals
Continental Army officers from Pennsylvania
People of Pennsylvania in the French and Indian War
Kingdom of Ireland emigrants to the Thirteen Colonies
People from Carlisle, Pennsylvania